Muchachitas como tú (English title: Young Girls Like You) is a teen Mexican telenovela produced by Emilio Larrosa for Televisa in 2007. It is an adaption of the Mexican telenovela Muchachitas, also produced by Emilio Larrosa. It premiered on April 23, 2007 and ended on November 9, 2007.

This telenovela tells the story of four girls: Elena Olivares, Isabel Flores, Leticia Hernández and Monica Sánchez Zuñiga. The villain is Federico Cantú, a psycho killer who will stop at nothing until he gets Guillermo's fortune (Monica's dad). Muchachitas como tú, although being strongly criticized in Mexico, was a great success; in its final episodes it was the most watched telenovela in Mexico, surpassing Pasión, the most watched telenovela in Mexico at that time.

Ariadne Díaz, Begoña Narváez, Gabriela Carrillo and Gloria Sierra starred as protagonists, while Fabián Robles, Silvia Mariscal, Angelique Boyer,  Carlos Cámara Jr., Claudia Troyo, Jorge de Silva and Manuela Imaz starred as antagonists.

The main theme song was performed by Spanish singer Belinda.

Plot
Elena, Isabel, Mónica and Leticia are four girls who meet at an acting school (TAES).They belong to different social classes, but for them it is not important, because their main value is friendship. Monica's mother and Elena's father have a past and it turns out that Elena and Monica are half-sisters. Federico Cantú (Fabián Robles) is Monica's cousin, he has been working for Guillermo, his uncle, who trusts him even though Federico's only interest is stealing his uncle's money.
Lety lies about her financial status and pretends to be wealthy.

Cast

Main
 
Laura León as Carmen Márquez de Barbosa
The Muchachitas
Ariadne Díaz as Leticia Hernández Fernández/Herfer
Begoña Narváez as Isabel Flores
Gabriela Carrillo as Elena Olivares
Gloria Sierra as Mónica Sánchez-Zúñiga Vásquez
Ana Isabel Torre as Olivia Villaseñor Sada
The Muchachitos
Marco Méndez as Joaquín Barbosa
José Ron as Jorge
Mike Biaggio as Rodrigo Suárez
Mauricio Barcelata as Roger Guzmán
Arturo Carmona as Diego Velázquez
Villains of "Muchachitas"
Claudia Troyo as Lucy Montenegro
Fabian Robles as Federico Cantú Sánchez-Zúñiga
Elizabeth Aguilar as Virginia Vélez
Mar Contreras as Lorena
Karla Luna as Gabriela
Thelma Dorantes as Lucia
Manuela Ímaz as Raquel Ortigosa
Eduardo Liñán as El Diablo
Silvia Mariscal as Martha Sánchez-Zúñiga
Mariana Morones as Renata
Raúl Ochoa as Abel
Jorge da Silva as Valente Quintanar
Oscar Traven as Felipe Montenegro

Supporting
 
Angelique Boyer as Margarita Villaseñor
Erika Garcia as Mariana
Tania Ibañez as Natalia
Lucero Lander as Esperanza Fernández
Ricardo Barona as Francisco "Pancho" Hernández
Maria Isabel Benet as Leonor Santos
Sergio Reynoso as Alfredo Palacios Flores
Dulce as Esther Cervantes #1
Socorro Bonilla as Esther Cervantes #2
Carlos Camara Jr. as Jose "Pepe" Olivares
Cecilia Gabriela as Verónica Vázquez
Roberto Blandón as Guillermo Sánchez-Zúñiga
Carlos Bracho as Bernardo Barbosa
Lalo "El Mimo" as Héctor Suárez
Yaxkin Santa Lucia as Rolando
Ramon Valdes as Raúl
Lorena de la Garza as Laura
Dylan Obed as Claudio
Hugo Aceves as Tolomeo
Lucia Zerecero as Mercedes
Fernanda Ruizos as Dra. Gwendolin
Lorena Velázquez as Teresa Linares
Danna Paola as Paola Velásquez
Alfredo Alfonso as Comandante Rubio
Mario Casillas as Luis Villaseñor
Silvia Manríquez as Constanza de Villaseñor
Paulina Martell as Silvia Hernández Fernández
Ricardo Silva as Lic. Julio César
Zoila Quiñones as Profesor Custodia Zamarripa
Mario Sauret as Profesor Timoteo
David Rencoret as Dr. Jacobo
Marina Marín as Trinidad "Trini"

Special guests
Maribel Guardia as herself
Lorena Enriquez as herself
Angélica María as herself
Eduardo de la Garza Castro as himself
Místico as himself
Jacqueline Voltaire as Fashion Hostess
Jesus More as TV Producer
Victor Jiménez as Judge
Gabriel Roustand as Police
Adriano Zendejas as Patricio

Original cast returns for special appearances
For this version, Laura León, best known as La Tia Carmen, returns to Televisa. Producer Emilio Larrosa and his team wrote a special character for her. This new character will guide the Muchachitas through their troubles. Laura León originally played Esther in the original version of Muchachitas.

The actor who portrays Pancho (Leticia's father) on the current version of the show acted as Abel Federico's assistant on the previous Muchachitas.

Kate del Castillo (Leticia) and Cecilia Tijerina (Mónica) make special appearances in this telenovela, they both received their big breaks in 1991 when they appeared in the first Muchachitas.

Music group
At the end of this telenovela, the four Muchachitas will form a group and record an album.

Awards

References

External links

 at esmas.com 
Logo image of Muchachitas como tú

2007 telenovelas
Mexican telenovelas
2007 Mexican television series debuts
2007 Mexican television series endings
Spanish-language telenovelas
Television shows set in Mexico City
Televisa telenovelas
Children's telenovelas
Teen telenovelas